Jamarkus McFarland (born November 26, 1990) is a former American football defensive tackle who is currently the defensive line coach at TCU (Texas Christian University).  McFarland was considered one of the best defensive tackle prospects of his class coming out of high school.

High school career
McFarland attended Lufkin High School in Texas, where he was teammates with Dez Bryant and Carrington Byndom and accounted for 53 tackles, 10 tackles for loss and four quarterback sacks in 2008. He was a 2008 first-team all-class by Texas Football, a second-team Texas all-state selection and also named Texas Academic all-state. He also was named district 15-5A Defensive MVP as a junior in 2007.

As a senior, McFarland was a USA Today and Parade All-American. He also played in the 2009 U.S. Army All-American Bowl. Considered a four-star recruit by Rivals.com, McFarland was listed as the No. 6 defensive tackle prospect in the nation, as well as the third-best run stuffer among defensive tackles. He was ranked third among the nation defensive tackles in the nation by Scout.com, who graded him as a five-star recruit.

McFarland picked Oklahoma over Texas, LSU and Southern California. His recruitment was the topic of a New York Times story, which included a passage describing a lavish party with free alcohol and drugs and topless women hosted by Texas boosters in Dallas.

College career
Because of the Sooners' depth at defensive tackle, McFarland was expected to redshirt in 2009. However, he saw some action in seven games as backup defensive tackle. He had a career-high two tackles in three games, and a career-high 1.5 sacks against Texas A&M. McFarland was named an All-Big 12 freshman by ESPN.com.

As a sophomore, McFarland appeared in all 14 games, starting three. He had his first career sack against Iowa State, finishing with 1.5 on the day. In his junior season, he played in 13 games and started 7, recording 21 tackles for the season.

In his senior year, McFarland became a full-time starter, starting in 12 contests. He recorded a career-high 28 tackles for the year, including six for a loss of yardage.

Professional career
McFarland was ranked 55th among defensive tackles available in the 2013 NFL Draft.

He went undrafted in the 2013 NFL Draft.

San Diego Chargers
McFarland was signed by the San Diego Chargers. On August 25, 2013, he was cut by the Chargers.

BC Lions
McFarland was signed by the BC Lions in May 2015, joining their practice roster in June.

Coaching career
McFarland joined Oklahoma's coaching staff as a graduate assistant in January 2016.

References

External links
 
BC Lions Bio
San Diego Chargers bio
Oklahoma Sooners bio

1990 births
Living people
People from Lufkin, Texas
American football defensive tackles
Oklahoma Sooners football players
San Diego Chargers players
BC Lions players
Oklahoma Sooners football coaches